South East Wales Transport Alliance (Sewta) was a consortium established by the 10 local authorities in South East Wales to promote and develop transport strategies and projects in the region. Founded on 1 April 2003, Sewta worked in close liaison with partners representing public transport operators.
 
Sewta was stood down on 19 September 2014.

Members
The members of Sewta were:
Blaenau Gwent County Borough Council
Bridgend County Borough Council
Caerphilly County Borough Council
Cardiff County Council
Merthyr Tydfil County Borough Council
Monmouthshire County Council
Newport City Council
Rhondda Cynon Taf County Borough Council
Torfaen County Borough Council
Vale of Glamorgan Council

Partners
The local authorities worked in partnership with:
Sustrans
Passenger Focus
Arriva Trains Wales
First Great Western
Network Rail
Bus Users UK
Confederation of Passenger Transport

Role and Aims
The main functions of Sewta were to:
prepare regional transportation strategies, plans and programmes
apply for external funding to carry out those programmes
act for the Councils in respect of programme actions resourced through that funding
respond to consultation documents having a regional dimension
advise the Councils on transportation issues.

Sewta did not have a responsibility for highway and road safety issues, nor did Sewta own or operate buses and trains.

References

External links

Transport in Wales
Transport organisations based in the United Kingdom
2003 establishments in Wales
2014 disestablishments in Wales